Kim Clijsters and Ai Sugiyama were the defending champions, but Clijsters chose not to participate. Sugiyama played alongside Liezel Huber, but they lost in the first round to Shinobu Asagoe and Rika Fujiwara.

Virginia Ruano Pascual and Paola Suárez won the title, defeating Svetlana Kuznetsova and Elena Likhovtseva in the final 6–0, 6–3.

Seeds

  Virginia Ruano Pascual /  Paola Suárez (champions)
  Svetlana Kuznetsova /  Elena Likhovtseva (finals)
  Liezel Huber /  Ai Sugiyama (first round)
  Nadia Petrova /  Meghann Shaughnessy (quarterfinals)
  Martina Navratilova /  Lisa Raymond (semifinals)
  Cara Black /  Rennae Stubbs (third round)
  Janette Husárová /  Conchita Martínez (quarterfinals)
  María Vento-Kabchi /  Angelique Widjaja (first round)
  Marion Bartoli /  Émilie Loit (second round)
  Li Ting /  Sun Tiantian (second round)
  Anastasia Myskina /  Vera Zvonareva (third round)
  Alicia Molik /  Magüi Serna (first round)
  Els Callens /  Meilen Tu (second round)
  Myriam Casanova /  Patricia Wartusch (second round)
  Silvia Farina Elia /  Francesca Schiavone (quarterfinals)
  Barbara Schett /  Patty Schnyder (third round)

Draw

Finals

Top half

Section 1

Section 2

Bottom half

Section 3

Section 4

External links
WTA Draw
2004 French Open – Women's draws and results at the International Tennis Federation

Women's Doubles
French Open by year – Women's doubles
2004 in women's tennis
2004 in French women's sport